In 2014, the  will participate in the Currie Cup and the Vodacom Cup competitions. The  team will also play in the 2014 Under-21 Provincial Championship and the  team in the 2014 Under-19 Provincial Championship. As part of the Southern Kings franchise, a number of players also participated in friendlies for this franchise.

Chronological list of events

 5 November 2013: The squad for the 2014 season is revealed.
 11 November 2013: Rynier Bernardo and Shane Gates join the  wider training group prior to the 2014 Super Rugby season.
 11 November 2013: The Kings announce that eighteen players from clubs from the Eastern Province union will be included in the EP Kings wider training squad for the 2014 Vodacom Cup. The players selected are: Raymond Darries (Progress), Monray Evans (Grahamstown Brumbies), Giovano Fourie (Despatch), Tildon Goliath (Hankey Villagers), Tashriq Hearn (SAPS), Ben Jacobs (Progress), Kalvano King (Trying Stars), Ben Kleynhans (SAPS), Lance Louw (Rosebuds), Ronwich Lovemore (Gardens), Vincent Mains (Grahamstown Brumbies), Athenhosi Manentsa (African Bombers), Lumko Mbane (African Bombers), Luvuyo Mhlobiso (Spring Rose), Kevin Plaatjies (SAPS), Curtis Sias (Progress), Wade Stuurman (Kruisfontein) and Ignick Windvogel (Hankey Villagers).
 17 November 2013: Lizo Gqoboka and George Whitehead join the  wider training group prior to the 2014 Super Rugby season.
 19 November 2013: Giovano Fourie declines an invitation to join the wider training squad for the 2014 Vodacom Cup due to work commitments in Rustenburg.
 10 December 2013: Carlos Spencer joins the Kings as kicking and specialist skills coach on a five-year contract.
 14 December 2013: Head coach Matt Sexton quits the Kings to return to New Zealand due to personal reasons.
 17 December 2013: Although initially signing for Toulouse as a medical joker, prop Schalk Ferreira signs a new three-year deal with the side, ruling out a return to the Kings.
 5 January 2014: Centre and vice-captain Andries Strauss joins Scottish side Edinburgh until 2016.
 7 January 2014: Tiger Mangweni retires as a player and is appointed as the defensive coach for the EP Kings' Vodacom Cup side.
 18 January 2014: Rynier Bernardo and Shane Gates, who were part of the  wider training group, are not named in their final training group.
 28 January 2014: It is confirmed that Academy coach Mzwandile Stick would be the coach of the Eastern Province Kings during the 2014 Vodacom Cup competition.
 13 February 2014: The  are promoted to the Premier Division of the Currie Cup competition after it was announced that the competition will be expanded from six to eight teams.
 20 February 2014: Kicking and specialist skills coach Carlos Spencer is also appointed as the head coach of the EP Kings for the 2014 Currie Cup Premier Division season.
 5 March 2014: The  squad for the 2014 Vodacom Cup is published.
 8 March 2014: The EP Kings lose 17–10 to Kenyan side  in the opening match of the 2014 Vodacom Cup. The Kings try scorers were Claude Tshidibi and Pieter Stemmet.
 10 March 2014: Edinburgh Rugby announce that lock Izak van der Westhuizen will join the  prior to the 2014 Currie Cup Premier Division season.
 15 March 2014: The EP Kings thrash Eastern Cape neighbours the  60–6 in a match played in Grahamstown. Masixole Banda and Brian Skosana both scored two tries, with Eben Barnard, Dwayne Kelly, Ivan-John du Preez, Selvyn Davids and Sonwabo Majola getting one each. Ntabeni Dukisa scored five conversions and a penalty while Dwayne Kelly also slotted a conversion. This result sees the Kings move up to fourth in the log.
Tries from Michael Killian, Selvyn Davids and Kuhle Sonkosi, as well as seven points from the boot of Ntabeni Dukisa weren't enough as Western Province ran out 56–22 winners at the same venue of their Round One loss to  – .
 26 March 2014: The Kings confirm three new signings for the 2014 Currie Cup Premier Division. Hooker Michael van Vuuren will join them from French Top 14 side Stade Français, along with two players from the  – centre Tim Whitehead and utility back Hansie Graaff.
 28 March 2014: The Welsh Rugby Union confirm that  will play a match against the Eastern Province Kings as preparation for their 2014 test series against . The match will take place at the Nelson Mandela Bay Stadium on 10 June 2014.
George Whitehead scored the Kings' only points of the match when he opened the scoring with a fifth-minute penalty.
 4 April 2014: A late drop goal from  fly-half Karlo Aspeling condemn the EP Kings to their third consecutive defeat and effectively out of contention for a quarter final spot. The  won 23–21 in George, leaving the Kings nine points off a top four spot with just two matches left to play. Ivan-John du Preez and Ntabeni Dukisa scored second-half tries for the Kings, with full-back Masixole Banda adding eleven points with the boot – one conversion and three penalties.
 7 April 2014: The Kings confirm the signing of  scrum-half Kevin Luiters on a three-and-a-half year deal.
 8 April 2014: Former Kings winger Paul Perez arrives in Port Elizabeth ahead of joining the Kings for the 2014 Currie Cup Premier Division, pending a full recovery from a knee injury.
 11 April 2014: The Eastern Province Kings record their first win in four matches, beating the  28–21 at the Nelson Mandela Bay Stadium. The Kings were awarded a penalty try late in the first half, with Cameron Lindsay and Siphesihle Punguzwa adding two more in the second half. Ntabeni Dukisa converted two tries and scored three penalties to complete the scoring.
 22 April 2014: Aidon Davis and Sergeal Petersen are included in the Baby Boks squad for the 2014 IRB Junior World Championship. However, results elsewhere confirmed that the Kings would not qualify for the Quarter Finals.
 25 April 2014: The Kings end their 2014 Vodacom Cup campaign by winning 27–11 against the previously-undefeated  in Durban. They scored three tries through Sergeal Petersen, Ntabeni Dukisa and Brian Skosana. Dukisa added another seven points by converting two tries and kicking a penalty and Kayle van Zyl converted the third try and also kicked a penalty to weigh in with five points. The result meant that the Kings consolidated fifth position in the Southern Section. Ntabeni Dukisa finished as top scorer for the competition with 50 points, while six players are tied in the top try-scoring charts with two tries apiece.
 28 April 2014: Lock Rynier Bernardo joins Welsh Pro12 side Ospreys on a three-year deal. Another departure is winger Michael Killian, who announced his retirement from professional rugby.
 20 May 2014:  hooker Edgar Marutlulle, who played four matches for the  during the 2013 Super Rugby season, also join in training sessions with the Eastern Province Kings. Meanwhile, scrum-half Dwayne Kelly join franchise partners  on a deal for the remainder of 2014.
 21 May 2014: The Eastern Province Rugby Union officially announces the signings of CJ van der Linde until the end of 2014 and Edgar Marutlulle until the end of 2015.
 29 May 2014: Ntabeni Dukisa's very short loan spell at  ends as he returns to the Eastern Cape to be closer to his sick mother. Fullback Masixole Banda is named in the  squad for the 2014 Currie Cup qualification competition.
 3 June 2014: Another trio of new players are announced for the EP Kings – South African-born Italian international scrum-half Tobie Botes from Treviso, prop Tom Botha from French side Montpellier and Australian lock Steve Cummins from Shute Shield side Eastwood. All three players join the Kings for the duration of the Currie Cup competition only.
Bulbring previously played first class rugby in Port Elizabeth in 2012 and 2013.
 17 June 2014: The previously-announced transfer of lock Izak van der Westhuizen is cancelled after he failed a medical. Van der Westhuizen suffered three concussions since the start of 2014 and a specialist advised that he should not play rugby for six months to a year.  and  fly-half Gary van Aswegen also joins the Kings for a one-month trial period.
 20 June 2014: The Southern Kings ran in ten tries as they beat a weakened  side 66–28 in a friendly match in Port Elizabeth.
 25 June 2014: Another new recruit for the Kings is  lock/flanker Shaun McDonald, who joins the side on a deal for the duration of the 2014 Currie Cup Premier Division.
 3 July 2014: The agent of  lock Tazz Fuzani confirm that he would leave Cape Town at the end of the 2014 season and join the Kings on a two-year contract.
 19 July 2014: The Eastern Province U18 side end the Craven Week as the top team by winning the unofficial final match, beating SWD U18 to win the tournament for the first time in 37 years.
 21 July 2014: Henning van der Merwe is appointed as the new kicking coach for the Kings until 2017.
 31 July 2014: The South African Schools side for 2014 is released. Four Eastern Province players that played at the Craven Week tournament are named in the squad – prop Lupumlo Mguca, loose-forward Junior Pokomela, fly-half Curwin Bosch and fullback Keanu Vers.
 19 August 2014: Centre Heino Bezuidenhout is also called up to the South African Schools team as a replacement for Morné Joubert.

Players

Player movements

They returned to their provinces after the 2013 Super Rugby season.

Vodacom Cup

Log

Round-by-round

Results

Player Statistics
The following table shows players statistics for the 2014 Vodacom Cup season:

 Tim Agaba, Ronnie Cooke, Aya Dlepu, Charl du Plessis, Shane Gates, Siyanda Grey, Ben Jacobs, Dwayne Jenner, Kevin Kaba, Lumko Mbane, Darron Nell, Foxy Ntleki, Devin Oosthuizen, Kevin Plaatjies, Steven Sykes, Marlou van Niekerk, MC Venter and Luke Watson were named in the 2014 Vodacom Cup squad, but never included in a matchday 22.

Player Appearances

The following players appeared for the Eastern Province Kings during the 2014 Vodacom Cup:

 Tim Agaba, Ronnie Cooke, Aya Dlepu, Charl du Plessis, Shane Gates, Siyanda Grey, Ben Jacobs, Dwayne Jenner, Kevin Kaba, Lumko Mbane, Darron Nell, Foxy Ntleki, Devin Oosthuizen, Kevin Plaatjies, Steven Sykes, Marlou van Niekerk, MC Venter and Luke Watson were named in the 2014 Vodacom Cup squad, but never included in a matchday 22.

International match

The Eastern Province Kings also hosted  in a warm-up match during their 2014 test series against .

Currie Cup

Log

Round-by-round

Results

Player Statistics

The following table shows players statistics for the 2014 Currie Cup Premier Division season:

 Enrico Acker, Eben Barnard, Hansie Graaff, Brenden Olivier, Paul Perez, Sergeal Petersen, Dane van der Westhuyzen and Marlou van Niekerk were named in the 2014 Currie Cup squad, but never included in a matchday 22.

Player Appearances

 Enrico Acker, Eben Barnard, Hansie Graaff, Brenden Olivier, Paul Perez, Sergeal Petersen, Dane van der Westhuyzen and Marlou van Niekerk were named in the 2014 Currie Cup squad, but never included in a matchday 22.

Southern Kings

Results

The Southern Kings lost their Super Rugby status at the end of the 2013 Super Rugby season, but lined up some friendly fixtures against other South African Super Rugby franchises prior to the 2014 Super Rugby season:

Under-21 Provincial Championship

Log

Round-by-round

Fixtures & Results

Players

The Eastern Province Kings Under-21 squad for the 2014 Under-21 Provincial Championship:

 – 2014 Under-21 Provincial Championship

Forwards
 Aidon Davis
 Ivan-John du Preez
 Francois Gerber
 Brendan Hector
 Kevin Kaba
 Enoch Mnyaka
 Matthew Moore
 Tyler Paul
 Siphesihle Punguzwa
 Tyrone Rankin
 Nic Roebeck
 John-Henry Schmitt
 Vukile Sofisa
 Claude Tshidibi
 Elandré van der Merwe
 CJ Velleman
 Warrick Venter
 Stephan Zaayman
 Did not play:
 Armand du Preez
 Jonathan Ford
 Zaine Marx
 Erwin Slabbert
 Arrie van der Berg
Backs
 Jaco Bernardo
 Selvyn Davids
 Aya Dlepu
 Riaan Esterhuizen
 Malcolm Jaer
 Sonwabo Majola
 Khaya Malotana
 Mario Mowers
 Sphu Msutwana
 Sergeal Petersen
 Juan Smit
 Warren Swarts
 Franswa Ueckermann
 MC Venter
 Did not play:
 Jason Baggott
 Dillon Beckett
 Ntsikelelo Mlamleli
 Sinethemba Skelem
 Sherwin Slater
Coach
 Ryan Felix

Player Statistics

The following table shows players statistics for the 2014 Under-21 Provincial Championship season:

Player Appearances

Under-19 Provincial Championship

Log

Round-by-round

Fixtures & Results

Players

The Eastern Province Kings Under-19 squad for the 2014 Under-19 Provincial Championship:

 – 2014 Under-19 Provincial Championship
Forwards
 Ronnie Beyl
 Dyllon Domoney
 Wynand Grassmann
 Matthew Howes
 Gerrit Huisamen
 Mathew Jackson
 JP Jamieson
 Arno Lotter
 Sintu Manjezi
 David Murray
 Qhama Mvimbi
 Mihlali Nchukana
 Tyler Paul
 Jayson Reinecke
 Elandré van der Merwe
 CJ Velleman
 Chris Whitting
 Thembelihle Yase
 Did not play:
 Justin Hollis
Backs
 Julio Abels
 Jason Baggott
 Luca Dalla-Vecchia
 Kewan Gibb
 James Hall
 Cameron Hertz
 Malcolm Jaer
 Martin Keller
 Garrick Mattheus
 Athi Mayinje
 Thabani Mgugudo
 Vinciënt Moss
 Luan Nieuwoudt
 Yamkela Nyalambisa
 Dylan Pietersen
 Dominik Uytenbogaardt
 Jason Vers
 Jeremy Ward
 Lindelwe Zungu
 Did not play:
 Luciano Daniels
 Luzuko Mase
 Dylan Vermaak
Coach
 Mzwandile Stick

Player Statistics

The following table shows players statistics for the 2014 Under-19 Provincial Championship season:

Player Appearances

Youth weeks

The Eastern Province Rugby Union announced their squads for the 2014 Under-18 Craven Week, the 2014 Under-18 Academy Week and the 2014 Under-16 Grant Khomo Week tournaments on 21 May 2014:

Under-18 Craven Week

The 2014 Under-18 Craven Week competition was held between 14 and 19 July 2014 in Middelburg. Eastern Province Rugby Union entered two sides – Eastern Province U18 and Eastern Province Country Districts U18. Eastern Province U18 became unofficial champions for the first time in 37 years as they won all three their matches and beat the SWD U18 team in the final match of the tournament.

Under-18 Academy Week

The 2014 Under-18 Academy Week competition was held between 7 and 10 July 2014 in Worcester. Eastern Province Rugby Union entered two sides – Eastern Province U18 and Eastern Province Country Districts U18.

Under-16 Grant Khomo Week

The 2014 Under-16 Grant Khomo Week competition was held between 7 and 10 July 2014 in Pretoria.

Under-13 Craven Week

The 2014 Under-13 Craven Week competition was held between 30 June and 4 July 2014 in Durban.

See also

 Eastern Province Elephants
 Southern Kings
 2014 Vodacom Cup
 2014 Currie Cup Premier Division
 2014 Under-21 Provincial Championship
 2014 Under-19 Provincial Championship

References

2014
2014 Currie Cup
2014 in South African rugby union